Cartoonists Remember 9/11 is a series of comic strips run on the tenth anniversary of the September 11, 2001 attacks on the United States. It included cartoonists from King Features Syndicate, Creators Syndicate, Tribune Media Services, Universal Press Syndicate, and Washington Post Writers Group.

History
Brendan Burford, comics editor for King Features, said, "Readers look to the comics page to reflect the national conversation, and on Sunday, Sept. 11, that's going to be the conversation."

Jeff Keane, co-author of The Family Circus told the Associated Press, "I knew that it was something that I think would work for Family Circus if I could find the approach for it. Because Family Circus is more of a realistic look at family, and I don't necessarily have a cartoon that is a 'joke a day,' but more sentimental and more emotional, it was easier for me to look at it that way." Jim Borgman, co-creator of Zits agreed, "As a cartoonist we would have all been wondering 'Is it OK to deal with this topic in our work?' Of course you can, but there is something comforting about the thought that a bunch of us are going to be struggling to say something on that day. My colleagues – cartoonists – are an astonishingly varied and talented group of people. I fully expect we'll see a broad range of approaches that day."

Exhibitions
The works were exhibited at the Newseum in Washington, D.C., the Cartoon Art Museum in San Francisco, the ToonSeum in Pittsburgh, New York City's Museum of Comic and Cartoon Art (MoCCA) and the Society of Illustrators in New York City.

Participating strips

 Agnes
 Apartment 3-G
 Archie
 Arctic Circle
 Ask Shagg
 B.C.
 Baby Blues
 Barney & Clyde
 Beetle Bailey
 Between Friends
 Big Nate
 Bleeker: The Rechargeable Dog
 Blondie
 Brewster Rockit: Space Guy!
 Buckets
 Buckles
 Candorville
 Chuckle Bros
 Crankshaft
 Curtis
 Daddy's Home
 Deflocked
 Dennis the Menace
 Dick Tracy
 Dog Eat Doug
 Dogs of C-Kennel
 Doonesbury
 Dustin
 Edge City
 The Elderberries
 Family Circus
 Fort Knox
 Freshly Squeezed
 Funky Winkerbean
 Gasoline Alley
 Grand Avenue
 Hägar the Horrible
 Heart of the City
 Heathcliff
 Heaven's Love Thrift Shop
 Herb and Jamaal
 Hi and Lois
 Home and Away
 Ink Pen
 La Cucaracha
 Liō
 Little Dog Lost
 Luann
 Mallard Fillmore
 Mark Trail
 Marvin
 Mary Worth
 Momma
 Mother Goose and Grimm
 Mutts
 Nancy
 Ollie and Quentin
 On a Claire Day
 On the Fastrack
 One Big Happy
 Over the Hedge
 Pardon My Planet
 Pluggers
 Pooch Cafe
 Prickly City
 Pros & Cons
 Real Life Adventures
 Red and Rover
 Reply All
 Retail
 Rhymes with Orange
 Rubes
 Safe Havens
 Sally Forth
 Sherman's Lagoon
 Shoe
 Six Chix
 Snuffy Smith
 Speed Bump
 Stone Soup
 Strange Brew
 Tank McNamara
 The Amazing Spider-Man
 The Brilliant Mind of Edison Lee
 The Duplex
 The Meaning of Lila
 The Other Coast
 The Pajama Diaries
 Tina's Groove
 Todd The Dinosaur
 Wizard of Id
 You Can With Beakman and Jax
 Zack Hill
 Zippy the Pinhead
 Zits

References

External links
 

Comic strips
Images about the September 11 attacks
Comics-related lists